Tajuk (English: Headlines) is a flagship television news program that broadcasts on the Indonesian TV station  TV 7. Its slogan is "Makin Lengkap, Makin Seru !" (The more Complete, The more Fun !). The program broadcast three times each day through Tajuk Pagi (breakfast news), Tajuk Sore (afternoon news) & Tajuk Malam (night news)

Tajuk was launched on January 21, 2002, by Jakob Oetama. and this program replaced by Berita was launched on  February 20, 2006.

References

External links 

  Portal News Site

  TV 7 site

Indonesian television news shows
Indonesian-language television shows
2002 Indonesian television series debuts
2000s Indonesian television series
2006 Indonesian television series endings